Maximum Impact is a 2017 action comedy film directed by Andrzej Bartkowiak, written by Ross LaManna, and starring Alexander Nevsky, Kelly Hu, Yevgeny Stychkin, Mark Dacascos, Danny Trejo, Tom Arnold and Eric Roberts. The film was released theatrically in Russia on November 30, 2017, and direct-to-video in the United States on October 2, 2018.

Plot 
A failed terrorist assassination attempt on the U.S. Secretary of State while he is visiting Moscow for international negotiations results in the abduction of his granddaughter. While the world sits on the brink of World War III special agents from the CIA and FSB must unite to save the girl and prevent war.

Cast 
 Alexander Nevsky as FSB Agent Maxim Kadurin
Kelly Hu as CIA Agent Kate Desmond
Mark Dacascos as Tony Lin
Tom Arnold as Barnes
Yevgeny Stychkin as FSB Agent Andrei Durov
Danny Trejo as Don Sanchez
William Baldwin as the Man in Shadows
Eric Roberts as Secretary of State Robert Jacobs
Polina Butorina as Brittany Jacobs
Matthias Hues as Ian
Alphonso McAuley as Nathan Robinson
Bai Ling as Scanlon
Keith Powers as Special Agent Vance
Odin Lund Biron as P.B. Floyd
 Hafedh Dakhlaoui as Goon 1

External links 
 
 
 
 Review of film 

2017 films
2017 action comedy films
2017 multilingual films
Russian action comedy films
2010s Russian-language films
Films shot in Russia
CineTel Films films
Films directed by Andrzej Bartkowiak
American multilingual films
Russian multilingual films
American action comedy films
Films set in Russia
Films set in Moscow
Films about the Federal Security Service
Films about the Central Intelligence Agency
2017 comedy films
2010s English-language films
2010s American films